Sarah Vandenbergh (born 9 October 1972 in Sydney, Australia) is an Australian actress and presenter.

Vandenbergh played the original role of Lauren Carpenter in Neighbours, 1993–94, and Kerry in Hollyoaks from 1999 to 2000. She was also a presenter on Fully Booked from 1996 to 1997  and appeared in the guest role of Lana Hemmings in Holby City. Later, appeared as a nun in short film Fancy Dress and as student Cassie Sanderson in Inbetweeners, a film about the British student experience. In 2006, she guest starred in an episode of McLeod's Daughters.

Today, Vandenbergh presents for TVSN, an Australian television shopping network.

References

External links
 

1972 births
Living people
Australian film actresses
Place of birth missing (living people)
Australian soap opera actresses